Frog's Hollow was a historic neighbourhood in the Brisbane central business district, Queensland, Australia. It was a colloquial name used for the low-lying land surrounding the intersection of Albert Street and Margaret Street.

Geography

Although not formally bounded, the neighbourhood was generally regarded as being between George Street (which is a ridge) down to Edward Street and between Elizabeth Street to Alice Street.

A creek used to pass through this swampy area joining the Brisbane River in the vicinity of the intersection of Alice Street and Edward Street. Although little more than a plank of wood, Brisbane's first British made bridge was over this creek, allowing the convicts to cross to their farm.

History
Being low-lying and swampy, with mosquitoes and periodic flooding, the area was not the most desirable part of colonial Brisbane. Being cheaper, the area attracted warehouse developments and housing and businesses catering to the lower classes. It was both the red light district of colonial Brisbane and its Chinatown. Prostitution, sly grog, and opium dens could be found in Frog's Hollow giving it a bad reputation.During the 1880s, many Anti-Chinese Leagues were formed which organised many Anti-Chinese demonstrations to persuade the government to cease immigration from China. On Saturday 5 May 1888, one such demonstration in Brisbane, fuelled by alcohol, turned into a riot, where the mob of an estimated 2000 people attacked Chinese homes and businesses. The riot spread to Chinese  premises in other parts of Brisbane, including South Brisbane and Fortitude Valley. The police did little to quell the riot with Police Inspector Lewis saying afterwards that "the majority of the people in the street were respectable citizens and would probably have been injured had this been done!". The only person arrested was subsequently acquitted.

Present day

The creek is no longer visible but the approximate location of the bridge is marked by a modern sculpture at the former Port Office. The convict farm is now the City Botanic Gardens.

References

Brisbane localities
History of Brisbane
Race riots in Australia